Shlomo Levi was an Israeli footballer, who played for Maccabi Haifa, Hapoel Haifa and Hapoel Ramat Gan, among others, and for Israel

Career

League football
Levi played youth football for Maccabi Tel Aviv from the age of 13. When he was 15 he sustained an injury during play and was told to quit football for life. While in army service, Levi participated in IDF Chief of Staff cup, which led to signing with Hakoah Tel Aviv.

In 1955, Levi transferred to Maccabi Haifa, where he played until 1958, at which point Levi put himself in "quarantine", a period of 12 months away from football after which he would be a free agent. At the end of the year, Levi signed with Hapoel Haifa, With whom Levi was the league's joint-top scorer in 1960–61 and 1961–62.

In 1963, Levi transferred to Hapoel Ramat Gan, which played in the second division. The club topped the league that season and won promotion to Liga Leumit. The following season, the club won the championship, with Levi being the top scorer for the club, with 14 goals. In 1966, Levi was released, on his request from Hapoel Ramat Gan, and at first signed with Hapoel Kfar Saba, but a few days later signed with Maccabi Hadera.

In 1968, Levi immigrated to Canada, where he stayed for four years, playing in the Canadian National Soccer League with local teams Montreal Hakoah and Superga, with whom he won the Quebec cup competition. Levi returned to Israel in 1972 and tried his hand in coaching at Hapoel Kafr Qasim, but retired from football after the season ended.

National team
Levi was part of the Israel team in the 1957 Maccabiah Games, which won the gold medal, scoring 7 goals. Levi was called to the national team ahead of the 1960 AFC Asian Cup and played his debut with the team in the first match of the tournament, against South Korea. Levi scored his first goal for the national team in the tournament's second match, against South Vietnam and added another goal in Israel's final match against the Republic of China, which secured Israel second place for the tournament.

Levi took part in Israel's campaign during 1962 World Cup qualification, scoring a hat-trick against Cyprus. In 1964, Levi was part of the squad for the 1964 AFC Asian Cup, as Israel won the tournament.

Career statistics

International goals

Honours

Club

Hapoel Ramat Gan

Israeli Premier League (1):1963–64
Liga Alef (second division) (1): 1962–63

Montreal Superga

Quebec Cup (1): 1971

International

Israel
AFC Asian Cup (1): 1964
Football at the Maccabiah Games (1): 1957

Individual
Israeli Premier League – Top Goalscorer (2): 1960–61, 1961–62

References

External links
 

1934 births
2003 deaths
Jewish Israeli sportspeople
Israeli footballers
Hakoah Tel Aviv F.C. players
Maccabi Haifa F.C. players
Hapoel Haifa F.C. players
Hapoel Ramat Gan F.C. players
Maccabi Hadera F.C. players
1960 AFC Asian Cup players
1964 AFC Asian Cup players
AFC Asian Cup-winning players
Israeli expatriates in Canada
Competitors at the 1957 Maccabiah Games
Association football forwards
Israel international footballers